Keiran St. Charles Alvarez Zziwa (born 7 November 1997) is a Canadian-Ugandan professional basketball player for the University of Manitoba  in the Manitoba Colleges Athletic Conference. He also represents the senior Ugandan national team.

Early life
Zziwa was born in Winnipeg, Manitoba, to Kanyago Charles Zziwa, a native of Uganda, and a Portuguese mother, Tracy Zziwa.

College career
Zziwa featured for the University of Manitoba Bisons from 2015–2021.

National team
He represents the senior Ugandan national team. He made his international debut for Uganda against Morocco in July 2021 during the qualifiers for AfroBasket 2021.

References

External links
Manitoba Bisons bio
Keiran Zziwa at USbasket.com
Keiran Zziwa at North Pole Hoops
Uganda beats Morocco to qualify for AfroBasket finals in Kigali
Kaluma magic bites Morocco as Uganda book AfroBasket slot

Living people
1997 births
Canadian men's basketball players
Ugandan men's basketball players
Forwards (basketball)
Guards (basketball)
Black Canadian basketball players
Canadian people of Portuguese descent
Canadian people of Ugandan descent